Dato' Muhamad Yusoff bin Mohd Noor  is a Malaysian politician who has served as State Leader of the Opposition of Penang since August 2018 and Member of the Penang State Legislative Assembly (MLA) for Sungai Dua since May 2013. He is a member of the United Malays National Organisation (UMNO), a component party of the state opposition but federal ruling Barisan Nasional (BN) coalition.

Election results

Honours
  :
  Officer of the Order of the Defender of State (DSPN) – Dato' (2019)

References

Living people
Malaysian people of Malay descent
Malaysian Muslims
United Malays National Organisation politicians
Members of the Penang State Legislative Assembly
Year of birth missing (living people)